Bhootayyana Maga Ayyu is 1974 Indian Kannada-language drama film directed by Siddalingaiah, who co-wrote the screenplay with Gorur Ramaswamy Iyengar, based on Iyengar's short story of the same name from his novel, Vayyari. The film stars Vishnuvardhan and Lokesh; with M. P. Shankar, Jayamala, Rushyendramani and Balakrishna all acting in supporting roles. The film revolves around the enmity between two villagers, Ayyu and Gulla and how they mend their relationship. 

Bhootayyana Maga Ayyu was a 12 page short story in a compilation of stories by Gorou Ramaswamy. Ramaswamy had initially declined to give the rights to the story but eventually agreed. Though Siddalingaiah added new plot details and characters to increase the running time of the film, it retains the core premise of the original short story. D. V. Rajaram acted as the film's cinematographer. The film was shot extensively at Kalasapur, Dharmasthala, and Talakadu. The film was edited by P. Bhaktavatsalam and the music was composed by G. K. Venkatesh, with lyrics written by Chi. Udaya Shankar and R. N. Jayagopal.

The film was released on February 2, 1974. The film ran for over 100 days in theatres, and later won the Karnataka State Film Award for First Best Film at the 7th Karnataka State Film Awards. The film also won three other Karnataka State Awards: Best Actor for Lokesh, Best Actress for Bhavani and Best Supporting Actress for Rushyendramani. The film was remade in Tamil as Ellorum Nallavare (1975), starring Muthuraman, in Hindi as Ek Gaon Ki Kahani (1975), starring Rakesh Pandey and in Telugu as Andharoo Manchivaare (1976), starring Shoban Babu.

Plot

Bhootayya is a ruthless zamindar of a small village, who used to mercilessly occupy the land of the villagers to whom he had lent money, when they fail to repay their debts. He was very shrewd and talked the villagers into building a dam across the river in the outskirts of the village, which was prone to floods. He gets hold of the fertile land on the banks of the river and builds a house for his son Ayyu.

A few days later, Bhootayya falls ill and eventually dies. The villagers rejoice at the death of Bhootayya and they hold such a grudge against the zamindar that nobody comes to even see his dead body. His son Ayyu tries to get some people to him in completing the funeral rites and offers a huge sum but nobody relents and Ayyu cremates Bhootayya by carrying him to the cremation ground all alone.

The villagers remain wary of Ayyu, and the most rebellious among them was Gulla. He is very outspoken and tries to restrict Ayyu from being mean and merciless towards the villagers like Bhootayya. Gulla's father had way back given a surety to Bhootayya for somebody else's debt and was unable to repay the money. Ayyu promptly goes with his men to confiscate Gulla's house. In an ensuing argument, Gulla smacks Ayyu.

Ayyu takes it seriously and files a police complaint against Gulla, who is then arrested by the police. Unable to bear the consequences, Gulla's father dies. Thus, begins a prolonged enmity between Gulla and Ayyu and both swear to kill each other. Gulla also hires a lawyer to teach Ayyu a lesson and starts spending all his property on the court case. When Gulla swears to kill Ayyu, Gulla's wife goes to Ayyu to warn him and also ask him to forgive her husband. But, Ayyu behaves ruthlessly with her and swears to kill Gulla.

Ayyu's wife reminds him about his father's attitude towards the villagers and their reaction when Bhootayya died. This makes Ayyu give a thought about his behaviour. Gulla's wife tries to kill herself by drowning herself in the river as she gets convinced that Ayyu will not spare her husband. Ayyu sees a woman drowning and being a distinguished swimmer saves her only to find that she is his enemy's wife. This incident has a lasting effect on Ayyu, who tries to end the feud. Ayyu clears all of Gulla's debts and he asks Gulla to work for him to pay off the debts. Gulla agrees and works sincerely to pay off the debts, but resents Ayyu's friendship.

During the village festival, the villagers plot to ransack Ayyu's house and the person who leads the pack is Gulla. They attack Ayyu's house at midnight, and set his house on fire. Ayyu, who is a changed person now, simply states this as an accident when the district police come to investigate the case. This incident begins to make an impact on the villagers to change their perceptions about Ayyu.

With his house burned down, Ayyu goes with his family to live in the house by the river. One day Ayyu goes to the town, leaving behind his family. The village is in flood and Ayyu's house is in danger. Ayyu's wife and kids try to come out of the house as the dam collapses and the water enters the house, flooding it completely. Gulla takes a raft and single-handedly sets out to rescue Ayyu's family. With much difficulty, he saves Ayyu's family and brings them to safety. Ayyu reaches the village and is shocked to see the plight of the village. But he is relieved to see that Gulla has rescued them.

Ayyu hugs Gulla and they end their years of hatred and enmity. The villagers help Ayyu to build a new house and the village continues to live in harmony. They all celebrate the festival.

Cast

 Vishnuvardhan as Gulla
 Lokesh as Sambhayya (Ayyu), son of Bhootayya
 M. P. Shankar as Bhootayya
 L. V. Sharada as Girija, Ayyu's wife
 Rushyendramani
 Bhavani as Mahadevi, Gulla's wife
 Balakrishna as Singlayya a.k.a. Bundekyatha
 Dinesh
 Honnavalli Krishna
 Venkatarao Talageri
 Loknath
 Joker Shyam
 Dheerendra Gopal
 Vaishali Kasaravalli as Puttamma

Production

Development 
Bhootayyana Maga Ayyu was a 12 page short story in a compilation of stories by Gorou Ramaswamy. The director Siddalingiah saw the potential of the story and wanted to make it into a film. He then went to Ramaswamy's house along with his producer Varadappa to buy the rights to the story. However, when Siddalingiah  put forward the proposal of making it a film, the author declined as he believed that there was no way one can make a film out of a 12 page short story. However, after one more visit to the author's house he finally gave in and sold the rights to the story to the director and the producer. Siddalingiah himself converted the story into a screenplay and asked his longtime friend Hunasur Krishnamurthy, to write dialogues. One of the co-producers of the movie, S. P. Varadaraj was the younger brother of actor Rajkumar. This was the first film of a Rajkumar family member in partnership with others.  H.R. Bhargava was the associate director of this movie.

Casting 
From the beginning Siddalingah decided not to included any big stars in the cast. After his two successful films (Doorada Betta and Bangarada Manushya) people around him attributed the success of his films to matinee idol Rajkumar, the star in both the films. He wanted to prove his ability as a director without the help of star value. He signed Lokesh, a popular theatre artist by then, as Ayya and pre-superstar Vishnuvardhan, as Gulla and MP Shankar as Bhootayya. Incidentally, this is the only film in which the grandmother and granddaughter duo of Bhavani and Rushyendramani ever shared screen space in.

Filming 
The film was shot extensively at Kalasapur, Dharmasthala, and Talakadu. This film was shot in Kalasapura village, near Chikmagalur town. Siddalingaiah had a particular attachment with this location. His other landmark movie Bangarada Manushya was also shot (partly) in the same village. The twenty-minute climax was an adaptation of one paragraph from the novel. The climax was shot in Kalasapura, Madarayanakatte, and Shivanasamudra falls for nearly 20 days. Initially a tank was constructed to allow water into the house but it broke as soon as the camera began to roll. Siddalingaiah got it reconstructed and shot the scene again. Similarly, ropes tied to the raft gave way and started drifting in the current. Expert divers immediately jumped in and got hold of it. The scene where villagers ransack Lokesh's house and set it on fire, Shivaiah had a fire engine stationed; wet gunny clothes were kept for exigencies, besides storing water in drums. Famous actress Jayamala was one of the group artists in the film.

Soundtrack

G. K. Venkatesh composed the soundtrack, and lyrics were written by Chi. Udaya Shankar and R. N. Jayagopal. The album consists of four tracks.

Release and reception
The film, released on February 2, 1974, received a huge reception despite having a non-popular star cast. It went onto complete 100 days in three theatres in Bangalore alone. With a budget of 12 lakhs, it grossed over 45 lakhs at the box office. Film critics, Ashish Rajadhyaksha and Paul Willemen in their book Encyclopedia of Indian Cinema, wrote, "the film is remembered for the tremendously popular performance of Shankar as the evil Boothayya."

Legacy 
The film was the first Kannada colour film to be completely shot in outdoors. In 2017, Kamal Haasan included the film in his list of 70 favorite movies, stating "Though this was a commercial film, it was done on a scale that only big Hollywood directors would think of. So much hard work went into the film." Malenada Henna Mai Banna is one of the evergreen songs in the history of Kannada films. The film also was the inspiration behind the title of the 2018 Kannada-language film named, Bhootayyana Mommaga Ayyu.

References

External links
 
 

1970s Kannada-language films
Films based on Indian novels
1974 films
Films scored by G. K. Venkatesh
Films directed by Siddalingaiah
Kannada films remade in other languages
Indian drama films
1974 drama films